A partial solar eclipse will occur on Saturday, March 11, 2062. A solar eclipse occurs when the Moon passes between Earth and the Sun, thereby totally or partly obscuring the image of the Sun for a viewer on Earth. A partial solar eclipse occurs in the polar regions of the Earth when the center of the Moon's shadow misses the Earth.

Related eclipses

Solar eclipses 2062–2065

References

External links 
 http://eclipse.gsfc.nasa.gov/SEplot/SEplot2051/SE2062Mar11P.GIF

2062 in science
2062 3 11
2062 3 11